Ulrich Voigt is an eleven-time World Puzzle Champion, and the most successful individual contestant. A German, he was born in 1976 in Borna near Leipzig and currently lives in Freiburg.

Ulrich started playing chess at the age of five; he is a FIDE Master with an ELO of over 2300.

Championships 
 World Puzzle Champion 2000, 2001, 2003, 2005, 2006, 2008, 2009, 2012, 2013, 2014, 2016.

References

External links 
Account of Ulrich's performance at the 17th World Puzzle Championship.

Living people
1976 births
Sportspeople from Leipzig
Puzzle competitions
Chess FIDE Masters
German chess players
People from Borna